Morgan Chesky is an NBC News correspondent based in Dallas, Texas. He was raised in Kerrville, Texas, and attended Sam Houston State University.

Previously, he was a news anchor in Seattle.

References 

Living people
NBC News people
People from Kerrville, Texas
Sam Houston State University alumni
Year of birth missing (living people)